Sargon Duran (born 31 January 1987) is an Austrian former professional footballer who played as a centre-back and current manager of Wiener Neustädter.

Coaching career
In July 2018, Duran was appointed assistant manager for Gerhard Fellner at Wiener Neustadt, while still playing for FC Mauerwerk. Fellner was sacked on 2 May 2019, and Duran was then appointed as caretaker manager until the end of the season.

On 13 June 2019, Duran was appointed assistant manager for FK Austria Wien under manager newly appointed manager Christian Ilzer. The duo left the club one year later. In September 2020, Duran was appointed assistant coach for the Austria's women national team. He left the position in May 2021, to become assistant coach at Admira Wacker. In June 2021, he moved to SV Sandhausen in a similar position. 

In the summer 2022, Duran was appointed manager of 1. Wiener Neustädter SC.

References

External links 

 
 Player profile at First Vienna FC 
 
 Sargon Duran at OEFB

1987 births
Living people
Footballers from Vienna
Austrian footballers
Austrian expatriate footballers
Association football midfielders
First Vienna FC players
SC Wiener Neustadt players
Tennis Borussia Berlin players
1. Simmeringer SC players
SK Rapid Wien players
SV Horn players
Floridsdorfer AC players
FC Mauerwerk players
Austrian expatriate sportspeople in Germany
Expatriate footballers in Germany
FK Austria Wien non-playing staff
Austrian football managers
1. Wiener Neustädter SC managers